The so-called Lower Bavarian Spa Triangle  or Rott Valley Spa Triangle (German: Niederbayerisches Bäderdreieck or Rottaler Bäderdreieck) refers to the three spa towns of Bad Füssing, Bad Griesbach and Bad Birnbach in the province of Lower Bavaria in southern Germany. These health resorts are in the districts of Passau (Bad Füssing, Bad Griesbach) and Rottal-Inn (Bad Birnbach) in the Lower Rott Valley.

The name is derived from the fact that the three locations form a triangle from a geographical perspective.

See also 
 List of spa towns in Germany

References 

Spa towns in Germany
Passau (district)
Geography of Bavaria
Lower Bavaria
Buildings and structures in Rottal-Inn